Lak may refer to:
 Lak, East Azerbaijan
 Lak, Hamadan
 Lak, Qazvin
 Lak, West Azerbaijan
 Lak Rural District, in Kuridstan Province